Gangr (or Gang; Old Norse: , 'traveller') is a jötunn in Norse mythology. He is portrayed as the son of Alvaldi and the brother of Þjazi and Iði.

Name 
The Old Norse name Gangr has been translated as 'traveller'. It is related to the Icelandic gangur and the Norwegian gang ('walking, hallway, corridor'), all stemming from Proto-Germanic *gangaz ('walking, going, way'; compare with Gothic gagg 'street, road', and with Old English and Old High German gang 'going, journey, way').

Attestation 
In Skáldskaparmál (Language of Poetry), Gangr is mentioned as the son of the jötunn Alvaldi, who is "very rich in gold", and as the brother of Þjazi and Iði.

References

Bibliography 

 

Jötnar